C62 or C-62 may refer to:
 Caldwell 62, a spiral galaxy
 , a Town-class light cruiser of the Royal Navy
 JNR Class C62, a class of Japanese steam locomotives
 Kendallville Municipal Airport, in Noble County, Indiana
 Ruy Lopez, a chess opening
 Safety Provisions (Building) Convention, 1937 of the International Labour Organization
 Testicular cancer
 Waco C-62, a proposed American high-wing transport airplane